Kisesa is an administrative ward in the Magu District of the Mwanza Region of Tanzania.
In 2016 the Tanzania National Bureau of Statistics report there were 9,889 people in the ward, from 30,486 in 2012.

Villages 
The ward has 22 villages.

 Nyang’hulukulu
 Ilagaja
 Igunga
 Igekemaja
 Ihale
 Wita
 Iseni bondeni “A”
 Iseni Bondeni “B”
 Kisesa kusini
 Igeye
 Changabe
 Kitumba A
 Kitumba B
 Igudija A
 Igudija B
 Gungumuli
 Igandya
 Kisha
 Mondo
 Kimanga
 Nyawipija
 Ng'wabupolo

References

Wards of Mwanza Region
Mwanza Region